A valgus deformity is a condition in which the bone segment distal to a joint is angled outward, that is, angled laterally, away from the body's midline.  The opposite deformation, where the twist or angulation is directed medially, toward the center of the body, is called varus. Common causes of valgus knee (genu valgum or "knock-knee") in adults include arthritis of the knee and traumatic injuries.

Knee arthritis with valgus knee

Rheumatoid knee commonly presents as valgus knee. Osteoarthritis knee may also sometimes present with valgus deformity though varus deformity is common. Total knee arthroplasty (TKA) to correct valgus deformity is surgically difficult and requires specialized implants called constrained condylar knees.

Examples

 Ankle: talipes valgus (from Latin talus = ankle and pes = foot) – outward turning of the heel, resulting in a 'flat foot' presentation.
 Elbows: cubitus valgus (from Latin cubitus = elbow) – forearm is angled away from the body
 Foot: pes valgus (from Latin pes = foot) – a medial deviation of the foot at subtalar joint.
 Hand: manus valgus (from Latin manus = hand)
 Hip: coxa valga (from Latin coxa = hip) – the shaft of the femur is bent outward in respect to the neck of the femur. Coxa valga >125 degrees. Coxa vara <125 degrees.
 Knee: genu valgum (from Latin genu = knee) – the tibia is turned outward in relation to the femur, resulting in a knock-kneed appearance.
 Toe: hallux valgus (from Latin hallux = big toe) – outward deviation of the big toe toward the second toe, resulting in bunion.
 Wrist: Madelung's deformity – deformity wherein the wrist bones are not formed properly due to a genetic disorder.

Terminology

Valgus is a term for outward angulation of the distal segment of a bone or joint. The opposite condition is called varus, which is a medial deviation of the distal bone. The terms varus and valgus always refer to the direction that the distal segment of the joint points. The original Latin definitions for varus and valgus were the opposite of their current usage. For a discussion of the etymology of these words, see the entry under varus. A mnemonic to remember the two deformities is that valgus contains an "L", for Lateral deviation.

See also
 Varus deformity

References

 Canale & Beaty: Campbell's Operative Orthopaedics, 11th ed. - 2007 - Mosby, An Imprint of Elsevier
 Bowed Leg (Varus) and Knock-Knee (Valgus) Malalignment: Everything You Need to Know to Make the Right Treatment Decision-Understanding lower limb malalignment-Tibial osteotomy for bowed legs, Noyes, Frank R. and Barber-Westin, Sue, Amazon Digital Version, Publish Green (October 6, 2013)

External links 

Arthropathies
Medical signs
Skeletal disorders